Winning a Woman is a 1925 American silent action film directed by Harry S. Webb and starring Jack Perrin, Josephine Hill and William J. Turner.

Cast
 Jack Perrin
 Josephine Hill
 William J. Turner
 Tom O'Brien

References

Bibliography
 Munden, Kenneth White. The American Film Institute Catalog of Motion Pictures Produced in the United States, Part 1. University of California Press, 1997.

External links
 
 

1925 films
1920s action films
1920s English-language films
American silent feature films
American action films
American black-and-white films
Films directed by Harry S. Webb
Rayart Pictures films
1920s American films
Silent action films